Storozhenko is a gender-neutral Ukrainian surname that may refer to
Marina Storozhenko (born 1985), Kazakhstani volleyball player
Mykhaylo Storozhenko (born 1937), Soviet-Ukrainian decathlete
Nikolay Storozhenko (disambiguation), several people
Oleksa Storozhenko (1806-1874), Ukrainian writer, anthropologist, playwright and criminalist
Olga Storozhenko (born 1992), Ukrainian model, teacher and beauty pageant titleholder 
Serhiy Storozhenko (born 1949), Ukrainian football functionary, president of the Kharkiv Oblast Football Federation

See also
 

Ukrainian-language surnames